Cao Cao (155 – 15 March 220), courtesy name Mengde, was a Chinese statesman, warlord and poet. He was the penultimate grand chancellor of the Eastern Han dynasty, and he amassed immense power in the dynasty's final years. As one of the central figures of the Three Kingdoms period, Cao Cao laid the foundations for what became the state of Cao Wei, and he was posthumously honoured as "Emperor Wu of Wei", despite the fact that he never officially proclaimed himself Emperor of China or Son of Heaven. Cao Cao remains a controversial historical figure—he is often portrayed as a cruel and merciless tyrant in literature, but he has also been praised as a brilliant ruler, military genius, and great poet possessing unrivalled charisma, who treated his subordinates like family.

During the fall of the Eastern Han dynasty, Cao Cao was able to secure most of northern China—which was at the time the most populated and developed part of China. Cao Cao was also very successful in restoring public order and rebuilding the economy as the grand chancellor. However, his manipulation of Emperor Xian as a puppet and figurehead was heavily criticised, as state affairs were effectively controlled by Cao Cao instead of the emperor himself. Opposition gathered around the warlords Liu Bei and Sun Quan, whom Cao Cao was unable to quell.

Cao Cao was highly skilled in poetry, calligraphy, martial arts and military strategy. He wrote many war journals, including commentary on The Art of War by Sun Tzu.

Early life

Cao Cao was born in Qiao, Principality of Pei (present-day Bozhou, Anhui), in 155. His father Cao Song was a foster son of Cao Teng, who in turn was one of the favourite eunuchs of Emperor Huan. Some historical records, including the Biography of Cao Man, claim that Cao Song's original family name was Xiahou and that he was thus a relative of Xiahou Dun.

Cao was known for his craftiness as an adolescent. According to the Biography of Cao Man, Cao Cao's uncle complained to Cao Song about Cao Cao's indulgence in hunting and music with Yuan Shao. In retaliation, Cao Cao feigned a fit before his uncle, who immediately rushed to inform Cao Song. When Cao Song went to see his son, Cao Cao behaved normally. When asked, Cao Cao replied, "I have never had a fit, but I lost the love of my uncle, and therefore he deceived you." Afterwards, Cao Song ceased to believe his brother regarding Cao Cao, and thus Cao Cao became even more blatant and insistent in his wayward pursuits.

At that time, there was a man named Xu Shao who lived in Runan and was famous for his ability to evaluate a person's potentials and talents. Cao Cao paid him a visit in hopes of receiving an evaluation that would help him politically. At first, Xu Shao refused to make a statement; however, under persistent questioning, he finally said, "You would be a capable minister in peaceful times and an unscrupulous hero in chaotic times." Cao Cao laughed and left. There are two other versions of this comment in other unofficial historical records.

Early career and Yellow Turban Rebellion (175–188) 

At the age of 20, Cao Cao was appointed district captain of Luoyang. Upon taking up the post, he placed rows of multicolored stakes outside his office and ordered his deputies to flog those who violated the law, regardless of their status. An uncle of Jian Shuo, one of the most powerful and influential eunuchs under Emperor Ling, was caught walking in the city after the evening curfew by Cao Cao's men and was flogged. This prompted Jian Shuo and other higher authorities to ostensibly promote Cao Cao to the post of governor of Dunqiu County while actually moving him out of the imperial capital. Cao Cao remained in this position for little more than a year, being dismissed from office in 178 for his distant family ties with the disgraced Empress Song. Around 180, Cao Cao returned to court as a Consultant and presented two memoranda against the eunuchs' influence in court and government corruption during his tenure, to limited effect.

When the Yellow Turban Rebellion broke out in 184, Cao Cao was recalled to Luoyang and appointed Captain of the Cavalry and sent to Yingchuan in Yu Province to suppress the rebels. He was successful and was sent to Jinan as Chancellor to prevent the spread of Yellow Turban influence there. In Jinan, Cao Cao aggressively enforced the ban on unorthodox cults, destroyed shrines, and supported state Confucianism. He offended the local leading families in the process, and resigned on grounds of poor health around 187, fearing that he had put his family in danger. He was offered the post of Administrator of Dong Commandery, but he declined and returned to his home in Pei County. Around that time, Wang Fen tried to recruit Cao Cao to join his coup to replace Emperor Ling with the Marquis of Hefei, but Cao Cao refused. The plot came to nothing, and Wang Fen killed himself.

Alliance against Dong Zhuo (189–191) 

After 18 months in retirement, Cao Cao returned to the capital Luoyang in 188. That year, he was appointed Colonel Who Arranges the Army, fourth of eight heads of a newly established imperial army, the Army of the Western Garden. The effectiveness of this new force was never tested, since it was disbanded the very next year.

In 189, Emperor Ling died and was succeeded by his eldest son (Emperor Shao), although state power was mainly controlled by Empress Dowager He and her advisors. The empress dowager's brother, General-in-Chief He Jin, plotted with Yuan Shao to eliminate the Ten Attendants (a group of influential eunuchs in the imperial court). He Jin summoned Dong Zhuo, a seasoned general of Liang Province, to lead an army into Luoyang to pressure the empress dowager to surrender power, braving accusations of Dong's "infamy". But before Dong Zhuo arrived, He Jin was assassinated by the eunuchs and Luoyang was thrown into chaos as Yuan Shao's supporters fought the eunuchs. Dong Zhuo's army easily rid the palace grounds of opposition. After he deposed Emperor Shao, Dong Zhuo placed the puppet Emperor Xian on the throne, since he deemed that Emperor Xian was more capable than the original puppet Emperor Shao.

After rejecting Dong Zhuo's offer of appointment, Cao Cao left Luoyang for Chenliu (southeast of present-day Kaifeng, Henan, Cao's hometown), where he built an army. The next year, regional warlords formed a military alliance under Yuan Shao against Dong. Cao Cao joined them, becoming one of the few active fighting members of the coalition. Although the warlords liberated the capital of Luoyang, Dong Zhuo's court managed to flee westwards to the former capital of Chang'an, abducting Emperor Xian. The coalition fell apart after months of inactivity, and China fell into civil war while Dong Zhuo was killed in 192 by Lü Bu.

Carving a territory (191–199)

Conquest of Yan Province (191–195) 

Through short-term and regional-scale wars, Cao Cao continued to expand his power. In 191, Cao Cao was appointed Administrator of Dong commandery (Dongjun) in Chenliu. This happened after he successfully fought against the bandit chieftain Bo Rao, and Yuan Shao named him Administrator in the stead of the ineffectual Wang Hong. He cleared Dong of bandits, and when the Inspector of Yan Province Liu Dai died the following year, he was invited by Bao Xin and other officers to become the Governor of Yan Province, and deal with an uprising of Yellow Turbans in Qing Province who raided Yan. Despite several setbacks, Cao Cao managed to subdue the rebels by the end of 192, likely through negotiations, and added their 30,000 troops to his army. In early 193, Cao Cao and Yuan Shao fought against the latter's cousin Yuan Shu in several battles such as Fengqiu, driving him away to the River Huai.

Cao Cao's father Cao Song was killed in autumn 193 by troops of Tao Qian, governor of Xu Province (who claimed to be innocent, and that Cao Song's murderers had been mutineers). Enraged, Cao Cao massacred thousands of civilians in Xu during two punitive expeditions in 193 and 194, to avenge his father. Because he took the bulk of his soldiers to Xu Province in order to defeat Tao Qian, most of his territory was left undefended. A number of discontented officers led by Chen Gong and Zhang Chao plotted to rebel. They convinced Zhang Miao (Zhang Chao's brother) to be their leader, and to ask Lü Bu to come with reinforcements. Chen Gong invited Lü Bu to be the new Inspector of Yan province. Lü Bu accepted this invitation and led his soldiers into the province. Since Cao Cao's army was away, many of the local commanders figured that fighting would be a lost cause and surrendered to Lü Bu as soon as he arrived. However three counties – Juancheng, Dong'a, and Fan, remained loyal to Cao Cao and when Cao Cao returned, he gathered his own forces at Juancheng.

Throughout 194 and 195, Cao Cao and Lü Bu fought several battles of some size for the control of Yan Province. Though Lü Bu initially did well in holding Puyang, Cao Cao won almost every engagement outside of Puyang. Cao Cao's decisive victory came in a battle near Dongming. Lü Bu and Chen Gong led a large army to assault Cao Cao's forces. At that time, Cao Cao was out with a small army, harvesting grain. Seeing Lü Bu and Chen Gong approaching, Cao Cao hid his soldiers in some woods and behind a dam. He then sent a small force ahead to skirmish with Lü Bu's army. Once the two forces were committed, he unleashed his hidden soldiers. Lü Bu's army was devastated by this attack and many of his soldiers fled.

Lü Bu and Chen Gong both fled after that battle. Since Xu province was now under Liu Bei's command and Liu Bei had been Cao Cao's enemy in the past, they fled to Xu for safety. Cao Cao decided not to pursue them and instead set about crushing Lü Bu's loyalists in Yan, consolidating his hold over that province. Eighteen months after the rebellion started, Cao had destroyed Zhang Miao and his family, and regained Yan Province by the end of 195.

Securing the emperor (196) 
Cao Cao moved his headquarters in early 196 from Puyang to Xu City (許, present-day Xuchang), where he built military agricultural colonies for the settlement of refugees and supply of food for his troops.

Around August 196, Emperor Xian returned to Luoyang under the escort of Yang Feng and Dong Cheng. Cao Cao joined Emperor Xian in autumn 196 and convinced him to move the capital to Xu City as suggested by Xun Yu and other advisors, as Luoyang was ruined by war and Chang'an was not under Cao's military control. He was appointed Minister of Works (after negotiating with his nominal superior Yuan Shao), and Director of Retainers (司隸 Sīlì), granting him nominal control over Sili Province. Furthermore, he became General-in-Chief (大將軍) and Marquis of Wuping (武平侯), though both titles had little practical application. While some viewed the emperor as a puppet under Cao Cao's control, Cao adhered to a strict personal code until his death that he would not usurp the throne. When he was approached by his advisors to overthrow the Han dynasty and start his own dynasty, he replied, "If heaven bestows such a fate upon me, let me be King Wen of Zhou."

To maintain a good relationship with Yuan Shao, who had become the most powerful warlord in China when he united the northern four provinces, Cao Cao lobbied to have Yuan appointed Minister of Works. However, this had the opposite effect, as Yuan Shao believed that Cao Cao was trying to humiliate him, since Minister of Works technically ranked lower than General-in-Chief, and therefore refused to accept the title. To pacify Yuan Shao, Cao Cao offered his own position to him, while becoming Minister of Works himself. While this temporarily resolved the conflict, it was the catalyst for the Battle of Guandu later.

Battling Zhang Xiu, Yuan Shu, and Lü Bu (197–198) 

Liu Biao was a major power at that time, holding all of Jing province. Jing had always been prosperous, but its population had grown in size because many people fled from the northern wars and sought refuge there. Therefore, Liu Biao constituted a danger to Cao Cao. Zhang Xiu commanded Liu Biao's territory on the border with Cao Cao, so Cao Cao went to attack him. In early 197 Zhang Xiu surrendered to Cao Cao, but later attacked his camp in the night (the Battle of Wancheng), killing many people, including Cao Cao's son Cao Ang, and forcing Cao Cao to flee.

After taking a few months to recover, Cao Cao turned his attention to Yuan Shu, who had recently proclaimed himself emperor of his new Zhong dynasty. In the name of restoring the Han dynasty, Cao Cao and other warlords formed a coalition against Yuan Shu, and Cao Cao seized all Yuan Shu's holdings north of the Huai River in the autumn of 197, while the latter's remaining territory suffered drought and a bad harvest, further decreasing his power.

Later in 197, Cao Cao returned south to attack Liu Biao/Zhang Xiu once more. This time, Cao Cao was very successful and greatly damaged their army. Cao Cao attacked Zhang Xiu again in 198 leading to the Battle of Rangcheng and was again victorious. He ultimately retreated from this campaign because he received word that Yuan Shao was planning to march on Xu, though this report turned out to be in error.

In April 198, Cao Cao sent envoys to incite the western warlords to attack Chang'an, still controlled by Dong Zhuo's successor Li Jue. One of Li Jue's subordinates, Duan Wei, mutinied and killed Li Jue along with his family in the summer of 198. Duan Wei sent Li Jue's head to Xu City (as a token of his submission to Cao Cao).

Meanwhile, Lü Bu was growing more aggressive. He drove Liu Bei (who fled to Cao Cao) out of his territory again and allied with Yuan Shu. Since Zhang Xiu had recently been crushed, he was in no position to be a threat in the south, so Cao Cao went east to deal with Lü Bu.

Conquest of Xu and Yu Provinces (199) 

Cao Cao defeated Lü Bu in numerous battles and eventually surrounded him at Xiapi. Lü Bu tried to break free but could not do so. Ultimately, many of his officers and soldiers defected to Cao Cao. Some were kidnapped by defectors. Lü Bu grew disheartened and surrendered to Cao Cao, who executed him on 7 February 199. By eliminating Lü Bu, Cao had obtained effective control of Xu Province.

With Lü Bu gone, Cao Cao set about dealing with Yuan Shu. He sent Liu Bei and Zhu Ling south to attack Yuan Shu. However, the rebel emperor died in the summer of 199 before Liu Bei and the others arrived. This meant Cao Cao had no major opponents in the Huai River region (Yu Province) anymore either. Meanwhile, in March 199 Yuan Shao had finally finished his war with Gongsun Zan at the Battle of Yijing, and was now planning to move south to defeat Cao Cao. Seeing this, Cao Cao set about preparing his defenses, intending to make his stand at Guandu. On the advice of Jia Xu, Zhang Xiu surrendered to Cao Cao and his forces were integrated into Cao Cao's army after they rejected an envoy from Yuan Shao to ally.

Uniting northern China (200–207)

Liu Bei's betrayal and defeat 
Near the end of the year 199, Liu Bei betrayed Cao Cao and killed his commanders in Xu Province, claiming to own the province. Cao Cao wanted to attack Liu Bei quickly so as to not get into a two-front war. While some in the court were worried that Yuan Shao would attack them soon if the main army were east, Guo Jia assured Cao Cao that Yuan Shao would be slow to react, and that Cao Cao could handle Liu Bei if he did it quickly. So on Guo Jia's advice, Cao Cao attacked Liu Bei and utterly defeated him in Xu Province, capturing Guan Yu as well as Liu Bei's family members at the start of 200. Liu Bei himself fled to Yuan Shao, who only sent a part of his army to make an attack on Cao Cao. This incursion was stopped by Yu Jin at the Battle of Dushi Ford in February 200, marking the outbreak of open warfare between Cao and Yuan.

War with the Yuan clan 

The Guandu campaign

In 200, Yuan Shao marched southwards on Xu City in the name of rescuing the emperor. He had amassed more than 110,000 troops, including 10,000 heavy cavalry, while Cao Cao gathered around 40,000 men, most of which he concentrated at Guandu, a strategic point on the Yellow River. Cao's army repeatedly repulsed Yuan's attacks and won tactical victories at Dushi Ford (February), Boma (March–May) and Yan Ford (May–August). The two armies came to a standstill at the Battle of Guandu (September–November), as neither side was able to make much progress. Cao Cao's lack of men did not allow him to make significant attacks, and Yuan Shao's pride forced him to meet Cao's force head-on. Despite his overwhelming advantage in terms of manpower, Yuan Shao was unable to make full use of his resources because of his indecisive leadership and Cao Cao's position.

Besides the middle battleground of Guandu, two lines of battle were present. The eastern line with Yuan Tan of Yuan Shao's army against Zang Ba of Cao Cao's army was a one-sided battle in favour of Cao, as Yuan Tan's poor leadership was no match for Zang's local knowledge of the landscape and his hit-and-run tactics. On the western front, Yuan Shao's nephew, Gao Gan, performed better against Cao Cao's army and forced several reinforcements from Cao's main camp to maintain the western battle. Liu Bei, then a guest in Yuan Shao's army, suggested that he instigate rebellion in Cao Cao's territories as many followers of Yuan were in Cao's lands. The tactic was initially successful but Man Chong's diplomatic skills helped to resolve the conflict almost immediately. Man Chong had been placed as an official there for this specific reason, as Cao Cao had foreseen the possibility of insurrection prior to the battle. A Cao raid destroying the Yuan supply depot at the village of Gushi forced Yuan Shao to set up an emergency supply depot at Wuchao. Finally in the 10th month, a defector from Yuan Shao's army, Xu You, informed Cao Cao of the location of Yuan's new supply depot. Cao Cao broke the stalemate by sending a special group of soldiers to Wuchao burn all the supplies of Yuan Shao's army, heavily demoralising it. Yuan performed a final, costly and ultimately failed storming of Guandu, and the next morning Cao launched a devastating surprise attack on the retreating enemy army, thus winning a decisive and seemingly impossible victory. In a report to Emperor Xian, Cao Cao claimed to have killed more than 70,000 of Yuan Shao's original 110,000 troops; he later ordered most captured enemy soldiers to be buried alive. A few months later, in May or June 201, Cao Cao defeated Yuan Shao again in the Battle of Cangting, eliminating the latter's last units south of the Yellow River.

Conquest of the north
Yuan Shao fell ill shortly after the defeat, and died in June 202, leaving three sons and no formally appointed successor. Although he seems to have favoured his youngest son Yuan Shang (controlling Ji Province) as his heir, his oldest son Yuan Tan (governor of Qing Province) challenged him and the two brothers entered into a war of succession, as they fought Cao Cao. Cao Cao used the internal conflict within the Yuan clan to his advantage, and during the Battle of Liyang (October 202 – June 203), he drove the Yuans back to their stronghold at Ye (under Yuan Shang's control). He then withdrew, consolidating his territorial gains rather than completing his conquest; possibly, dissidents at the imperial court in Xu required his attention. Temporarily relieved from Cao Cao's pressure, the fraternal feud escalated and Yuan Shang besieged Yuan Tan's base at Pingyuan, forcing the latter to conclude a marriage alliance with Cao Cao. The province of Ji fell to Cao Cao in the summer of 204 after the five month long Siege of Ye. Cao Cao paid his respects at Yuan Shao's tomb after conquering Ye, weeping bitterly for his old friend in front of his followers and giving Yuan Shao's family consolatory gifts and a government pension. Yuan Shang fled north to the third son, governor Yuan Xi of You Province, while Gao Gan, governor of Bing Province, defected to Cao Cao. In January and February 205, Cao Cao turned on the disloyal Yuan Tan, defeated and killed him in the Battle of Nanpi, and conquered Qing Province. Gao Gan rebelled in 205, but in 206 Cao Cao defeated and killed him, annexing Bing definitively.

Cao Cao assumed effective rule over all of northern China. Suffering mutiny amongst their own troops, Yuan Shang and Yuan Xi fled to the Wuhuan chieftains for aid. The Wuhuan chieftain Tadun assisted the Yuan brothers and started raiding Cao's territory. In 207, Cao Cao led a daring campaign beyond Chinese borders in hopes of destroying the Yuans once and for all. He fought an alliance of Wuhuan chieftains at the Battle of White Wolf Mountain. Though outnumbered and isolated, Cao Cao emerged victorious due to cleverly engineering his supply lines by digging two new canals and flanking the enemy, killing Tadun and forcing the Yuans to flee once again. This time, they went to Gongsun Kang for help, but he executed them and sent their heads to Cao Cao, granting him nominal control over You Province. Meanwhile, the northern tribes were now terrified of Cao Cao. Most of the remaining Wuhuan submitted to him, along with the Xianbei and Xiongnu.

Red Cliffs and the South campaign (208–210)

Temporary takeover of Jing Province (208) 

After Yuan Shao's defeat at Guandu in 200, Cao Cao forced Liu Bei to flee to the governor of Jing Province, Liu Biao, who stationed him at the northern border in Xinye County to keep Cao Cao at bay. An initial Cao attack on Liu Bei was repelled during the Battle of Bowang (202). After completing his conquest of northern China in 207, Cao Cao turned his full attention to Jing Province, where a succession dispute erupted after the death of Liu Biao in August 208. Liu Biao's chosen heir was his younger son Liu Cong, but his elder son Liu Qi challenged him for the governorship, while Sun Quan attacked the eastern territories of Jing, Liu Bei hoped to usurp Jing for himself, and Cao Cao moved to invade Jing from the north with a hastily assembled army in September. Cao Cao's action proved to be decisive: Liu Cong surrendered to him without a fight, while Liu Bei fled south, but was slowed down by a large following of refugees. Cao Cao's 5,000 elite cavalry force caught up with Liu Bei and utterly defeated him at the Battle of Changban in October, capturing the baggage train and refugee column. Liu Bei himself narrowly escaped east with a handful of companions, linked up with Liu Qi at Fankou and sent Zhuge Liang to negotiate an alliance with Sun Quan, who eventually agreed to join forces. Cao Cao gained control of a large portion of the Yangtze river by occupying the Jiangling naval base, and ordered most of his army to sail down the river towards Chibi (Red Cliffs), while the rest marched over land, to defeat the newly forged alliance in one swift stroke.

Battle of Red Cliffs 

At the Battle of Red Cliffs in the winter of 208, Cao Cao's forces were defeated by the coalition of Liu Bei and Sun Quan (who later founded the states of Shu Han and Eastern Wu respectively, becoming his arch-rivals in reunifying China). Despite superior numbers, the northern troops were exhausted from marching, prone to sickness in the unfamiliar southern climate and seasick on the river fleet (which they tried to mitigate by chaining the ships together), while especially the Sun soldiers were still fresh and experienced in riverine warfare. Allied general Huang Gai pretended to defect to the northerners, but took advantage of the fact that the Cao ships had been chained together to destroy them with fire ships. Meanwhile, an allied amphibious attack led by Zhou Yu routed Cao Cao's land forces at Wulin.

Throughout 209 and 210, Cao Cao's commanders were engaged in defensive efforts against Sun Quan. In battles at Jiangling and Yiling, Cao Cao's commanders in northern Jing (such as Cao Ren) fought against Sun Quan. They experienced mixed success, and Cao Cao was able to retain some territory in the north of that province. At the same time, they held off an attack on Hefei and put down a revolt in Lu that Sun Quan's forces tried to assist, keeping Sun Quan from moving to attack Shouchun. However, Cao Cao's commanders in southern Jing, cut off from the rest of Cao Cao's forces, surrendered to Liu Bei. Liu Qi initially succeeded his father as Inspector of Jing Province, but died in 209, after which Sun Quan appointed Liu Bei as Governor of Jing Province, and married off his sister Lady Sun to him to cement the alliance.

Campaigns in the northwest (211–220) 

By 211, the situation in the south had stabilized and Cao Cao decided to crush his remaining enemies in the north, to the west of Chang'an (in Zuopingyi Commandery). In Hanzhong commandery on the Han River, in the north of Yi Province, Zhang Lu lived in revolt against the Han dynasty, running his own theocratic state. Cao Cao sent Zhong Yao with an army to force Zhang Lu's surrender. However, this disturbed a number of warlords in the Wei River valley and the wider Liang Province, who united under Han Sui and Ma Chao to oppose Cao Cao, believing that his maneuvers against Zhang Lu were actually directed at them. Cao Cao personally led the army against this alliance, and outmaneuvered the rebel army at every turn in the Battle of Tong Pass. The alliance shattered and many of the leaders were killed. Cao Cao spent the next month or two hunting down some of the leaders, many of whom surrendered to him. He left the region in 212 and left behind Xiahou Yuan, whose campaigns consolidated the rest of the northwest under Cao Cao's control. 
 
In 213, Cao Cao received the title "Duke of Wei" and was given the nine bestowments and a fief of ten cities under his domain, known as Wei. That same year, he marched south and attacked Ruxu. Sun Quan's general Lü Meng held off the attacks for about a month, and Cao Cao had to pull back in the end, confirming Sun Quan's control of the southeast. In 215, Cao Cao moved into and took over Hanzhong in the Battle of Yangping, though Liu Bei conquered the region from him a few years later. In 216, Cao Cao was promoted to the status of a vassal king – "King of Wei". Over the years, Cao Cao, as well as Liu Bei and Sun Quan, continued to consolidate their power in their respective regions. Through many wars, China became divided into three powers – Wei, Shu and Wu, which fought sporadic battles without the balance tipping significantly in anyone's favour. The only exception was when Liu Bei's forces were able to take Hanzhong from Cao Cao's army after a campaign that took two years.

Death 

On 15 March 220, Cao Cao died in Luoyang at the age of 65, having failed to unify China under his rule, allegedly of a "head disease". His will instructed that he be buried near Ximen Bao's tomb in Ye without gold and jade treasures, and that his subjects on duty at the frontier were to stay in their posts and not attend the funeral as, in his own words, "the country is still unstable".

Cao Cao's eldest surviving son Cao Pi succeeded him. Within a year, Cao Pi forced Emperor Xian to abdicate and proclaimed himself the first emperor of the state of Cao Wei. Cao Cao was then posthumously titled "Grand Ancestor Emperor Wu of Wei".

Cultural legacy

While historical records indicate Cao Cao as a brilliant ruler, he was represented as a cunning and deceitful man in Chinese opera, where his character is given a white facial makeup to reflect his treacherous personality. When Luo Guanzhong wrote the historical novel Romance of the Three Kingdoms, he took much of his inspiration from Chinese opera.

As a result, depictions of Cao Cao as unscrupulous have become much more popular among the common people than his real image. There have been attempts to revise this depiction.

As the novel Romance of the Three Kingdoms has been adapted to modern forms of entertainment, so has its portrayal of Cao Cao. Given the source material upon which these adaptations are founded, Cao Cao continues to be characterised as a prominent villain.

Through to modern times, the Chinese equivalent of the English idiom "speak of the Devil" is "speak of Cao Cao and Cao Cao arrives".

After the Communists won the Chinese Civil War in 1949, some people in China thought there might be some similarities between Cao Cao and Mao Zedong. In 1959, Peng Dehuai wrote a letter to Mao, in which he compared himself to Zhang Fei: because Mao Zedong compares himself to Cao Cao, Peng's comparison implied that he had an intuitively confrontational relationship with Mao. Mao had the letter widely circulated in order to make Peng's attitude clear to other Party members, and proceeded to purge Peng, eventually ending Peng's career.

In Romance of the Three Kingdoms 

Romance of the Three Kingdoms, a historical novel composed by Luo Guanzhong in the 14th century (11 centuries after Cao Cao's death), was a romanticisation of the events that occurred in the late Han dynasty and the Three Kingdoms period. While adhering to historical facts most of the time, the novel inevitably reshaped Cao Cao to some extent, so as to portray him as a cruel and suspicious villain. In some chapters, Luo created fictional or semi-fictional events involving Cao Cao.

See the following for some fictitious stories in Romance of the Three Kingdoms involving Cao Cao:
 
 
 Lü Boshe

Agriculture and education
While waging military campaigns against his enemies, Cao Cao did not forget the basis of society – agriculture and education.

In 194, a locust plague caused a major famine across China. The people resorted to cannibalism out of desperation. Without food, many armies were defeated without fighting. From this experience, Cao Cao saw the importance of an ample food supply in building a strong military. He began a series of agricultural programs in cities such as Xu City and Chenliu. Refugees were recruited and given wasteland to cultivate. Later, encampments not faced with imminent danger of war were also made to farm. This system was continued and spread to all regions under Cao Cao as his realm expanded. Although Cao Cao's primary intention was to build a powerful army, the agricultural program also improved the living standards of the people, especially war refugees.

By 203, Cao Cao had eliminated most of Yuan Shao's forces. This afforded him more attention on construction within his realm. In autumn of that year, Cao Cao passed an order decreeing the promotion of education throughout the counties and cities within his jurisdiction. An official in charge of education was assigned to each county with more than 500 households. Youngsters with potential and talent were selected for schooling. This prevented a lapse in the training of intellectuals in those years of war, and, in Cao Cao's words, would benefit the people.

Poetry

Cao Cao was an accomplished poet, as were his sons Cao Pi and Cao Zhi. He was also a patron of poets such as Xu Gan. Of Cao Cao's works, only a remnant remain today. His verses, unpretentious yet profound, helped to reshape the poetic style of his time and beyond, eventually contributing to the poetry styles associated with Tang dynasty poetry. Cao Cao, Cao Pi and Cao Zhi are known collectively as the "Three Caos". The Three Caos' poetry, together with additional poets, became known as the "Jian'an" style, which contributed eventually to Tang and later poetry. Cao Cao also wrote verse in the older four-character per line style characteristic of the Classic of Poetry. Burton Watson describes Cao Cao as: "the only writer of the period who succeeded in infusing the old four-character metre with any vitality, mainly because he discarded the archaic diction associated with it and employed the ordinary poetic language of his time." Cao Cao is also known for his early contributions to the Shanshui poetry genre, with his 4-character-per-line, 14-line poem "View of the Blue Sea" (觀滄海).

Mausoleum 

On 27 December 2009, the Henan Provincial Cultural Heritage Bureau reported the discovery of Cao Cao's tomb in Xigaoxue Village, Anyang County, Henan. The tomb, covering an area of 740 square metres, was discovered in December 2008 when workers at a nearby kiln were digging for mud to make bricks. Its discovery was not reported and the local authorities knew of it only when they seized a stone tablet carrying the inscription 'King Wu of Wei' — Cao Cao's posthumous title — from grave robbers who claimed to have stolen it from the tomb. Over the following year, archaeologists recovered more than 250 relics from the tomb. The remains of three persons — a man in his 60s, a woman in her 50s and another woman in her 20s — were also unearthed and are believed to be those of Cao Cao, one of his wives, and a servant.

Since the discovery of the tomb, there have been many skeptics and experts who pointed out problems with it and raised doubts about its authenticity. In January 2010, the State Administration of Cultural Heritage legally endorsed the initial results from research conducted throughout 2009 suggesting that the tomb was Cao Cao's. However, in August 2010, 23 experts and scholars presented evidence at a forum held in Suzhou, Jiangsu to argue that the findings and the artifacts of the tomb were fake. In September 2010, an article published in an archaeology magazine claimed that the tomb and the adjacent one actually belonged to Cao Huan (a grandson of Cao Cao) and his father Cao Yu.

In 2010, the tomb became part of the fifth batch of Major Historical and Cultural Sites Protected at the National Level in China. , it has been announced that the local government in Anyang is constructing a museum on the original site of the tomb which will be named 'Cao Cao Mausoleum Museum'.

Media reports from 2018 describe the tomb complex as having an outer rammed earth foundation, a spirit way, and structures on the east and south sides. Archaeologists have also noted that the tomb's exterior and perimeter appear to be deliberately left unmarked; there are neither structures above the ground around the tomb nor massive piles of debris in the vicinity. This indirectly confirms historical records that Cao Pi had ordered the monuments on the surface to be systematically dismantled to honour his father's wishes to be buried in a simple manner in a concealed location, as well as to prevent tomb robbers from finding and looting the tomb.

Family 
Consorts and Issue:
Furen, of the Ding clan (d. 219)
 Empress Wuxuan, of the Bian clan (159–230)
 Emperor Wen (187–226), second son
 Cao Zhang, Prince Wei of Rencheng (189–223), third son
 Cao Zhi, Prince Si of Chen (192–232), fourth son
 Cao Xiong, Prince Huai of Xiao
 Empress Xianmu (197–260), personal name Jie, married Emperor Xian, and had issue (one daughter)
 Cao Hua, a daughter, personal name Hua, married Emperor Xian
 Furen, of the Liu clan
 Cao Ang, Prince Min of Feng (177–197), first son
 Cao Shuo, Prince Shang of Xiang
 Princess Qinghe, married Xiahou Mao
 Furen, of the Huan clan
Cao Chong, Prince Ai of Deng (196–208)
 Cao Ju, Prince of Pengcheng
 Cao Yu, Prince of Yan (d. 278)
 Furen, of the Du clan
 Cao Lin, Prince Mu of Pei (d. 256)
 Cao Gun, Prince Gong of Zhongshan (d. 235)
 Princess Jinxiang, married He Yan (196–249), and had issue (one son)
 Furen, of the Qin clan
 Cao Xuan, Prince Huai of Jiyang
 Cao Jun, Prince Gong of Chenliu (d. 259)
 Furen, of the Yin clan
 Cao Ju, Prince Min of Fanyang
 Lady, of the Sun clan
 Cao Shang, Duke Shang of Linyi
 Cao Biao, Prince of Chu (195–251)
 Cao Qin, Duke Shang of Gang
 Lady, of the Li clan
 Cao Cheng, Duke Shang of Gucheng
 Cao Zheng, Duke Dai of Mei (d. 218)
 Cao Jing, Duke Shang of Ling
 Lady, of the Zhou clan
 Cao Jun, Duke An of Fan (d. 219)
 Lady, of the Chen clan
 Cao Gan, Prince of Zhao (214–261)
 Lady, of the Liu clan
 Cao Ziji, Duke Shang of Guangzong
 Lady, of the Song clan
 Cao Hui, Prince Ling of Dongping (d. 242)
 Lady, of the Zhao clan
 Cao Mao, Prince of Laoling
 Unknown
 Cao Xian, a daughter, personal name Xian, married Emperor Xian
 Princess Anyang, married Xun Yun of Yingchuan, the first son of Xun Yu, and had issue (two sons)

Ancestry

Cao Cao was a purported descendant of the Western Han dynasty chancellor Cao Shen. In the early 2010s, researchers from Fudan University compared the Y chromosomes collected from a tooth from Cao Cao's granduncle, Cao Ding, with those of Cao Shen and found them to be significantly different. Therefore, the claim about Cao Cao descending from Cao Shen was not supported by genetic evidence. The researchers also found that the Y chromosomes of Cao Ding match those of self-proclaimed living descendants of Cao Cao who hold lineage records dating back to more than 100 generations ago.

Zhu Ziyan, a history professor from Shanghai University, felt that Cao Ding's tooth alone cannot be used as evidence to determine Cao Cao's ancestry. He was sceptical about whether those who claim to be Cao Cao's descendants are really so, because genealogical records dating from the Song dynasty (960–1279) are already so rare in the present day, much less those dating from the Three Kingdoms era (220–280). Besides, according to historical records, Cao Ding was a younger brother of the eunuch Cao Teng, who adopted Cao Cao's biological father, Cao Song. Therefore, Cao Cao had no known blood relations with Cao Ding. In other words, Cao Ding was not Cao Cao's real granduncle (this assuming that there was no intra-family adoption, which was actually common in China). Zhu Ziyan mentioned that Fudan University's research only proves that those self-proclaimed descendants of Cao Cao are related to Cao Ding; it does not directly relate them to Cao Cao.

In popular culture

His depiction in “The Romance of the Three Kingdoms” led to the common Chinese adage “Speak of Cao-Cao” which is the same as the Western - “speak of the devil, and the devil will appear.”

Film and television
The "Father of Hong Kong cinema", Lai Man-Wai, played Cao Cao in The Witty Sorcerer, a 1931 comedy film based on the story of Zuo Ci playing tricks on Cao Cao. In the Shaw Brothers film The Weird Man, Cao Cao was seen in the beginning of the film with Zuo Ci. Zuo Ci was playing tricks on him by giving him a tangerine with no fruit inside. This was later referenced in another film titled Five Element Ninjas.

Other notable actors who have portrayed Cao Cao in film and television include:
 Bao Guo'an, in the 1994 Chinese television series Romance of the Three Kingdoms. Bao won two Best Actor awards at the 1995 Golden Eagle Awards and Flying Apsaras Awards for his performance.
 Damian Lau, in the 2008 Hong Kong film Three Kingdoms: Resurrection of the Dragon.
 Zhang Fengyi, in the 2008–09 Chinese film Red Cliff.
 Chen Jianbin, in the 2010 Chinese television series Three Kingdoms.
 Jiang Wen, in the 2011 Hong Kong film The Lost Bladesman and the 2018 Chinese television series Cao Cao.
 Chow Yun-fat, in the 2012 Chinese film The Assassins.
 Zhao Lixin, in the 2014 Chinese television series Cao Cao.
 Yu Hewei, in the 2017 Chinese television series The Advisors Alliance.
 Tse Kwan-ho, in the 2018 Chinese television series Secret of the Three Kingdoms.
 Wang Kai, in the 2021 Hong Kong film Dynasty Warriors.

Card games
In the selection of hero cards in the Chinese card game San Guo Sha, there is also a Cao Cao hero that players can select at the beginning of the game.

Cao Cao is also referenced in Magic: The Gathering, as the card "Cao Cao, Lord of Wei". This card is black, the colour representing ruthlessness and ambition, though not necessarily evil. It was first printed in Portal Three Kingdoms and again in From the Vault: Legends.

Video games

Cao Cao appears in Koei's Romance of the Three Kingdoms video game series. He is also featured as a playable character in Koei's Dynasty Warriors and Warriors Orochi series. He also features in Koei's Kessen II as a playable main character.

Cao Cao also appears in Puzzle & Dragons as part of the Three Kingdoms Gods series.

Cao Cao appears as a Great Person in Civilization IV and later as a Great General in Civilization V.

He is also featured as one of the available warlords that the player can choose from in Creative Assembly's game Total War: Three Kingdoms.

Cao Cao is a major character in Capcom's Tenchi wo Kurau video game series, all of which were based on the manga of the same name.

Cao Cao appears as a Legendary Commander in the mobile game Rise of Kingdoms.

See also
 Cao Wei family trees
 Lists of people of the Three Kingdoms
Bronze Bird Terrace
 Empty Fort Strategy

Notes

References

Citations

Sources 

 
 Domes, Jurgen. Peng Te-huai: The Man and the Image, London: C. Hurst & Company. 1985. .
 
 
 
 
 
 
 
 
 
 Yip, Wai-lim (1997). Chinese Poetry: An Anthology of Major Modes and Genres. (Durham and London: Duke University Press).

External links

Cao Cao – World History Encyclopedia
 
 

155 births
220 deaths
3rd-century Chinese poets
3rd-century heads of government

Chinese non-fiction writers
Han dynasty poets
Han dynasty politicians from Anhui
Han dynasty prime ministers
Han dynasty warlords
Poets from Anhui
Politicians from Bozhou
Political office-holders in Hebei
Political office-holders in Shandong
Regents of China